"Heartbreak Feels So Good" is a song by American rock band Fall Out Boy, released on January 25, 2023, through Fueled by Ramen and DCD2. It was released as the second single from the band's upcoming eighth studio album, So Much (for) Stardust.

Background 
Teasing the song, the band posted a photo of a package with a set of coordinates leading to the Field of Dreams Movie Site in Dyersville, Iowa. The package contained another seashell marked 2 of 13 with a letter, this time printed was the date January 25, 2023, and a speculated song title "Heartbreak Feels So Good". On January 23, 2023, the band announced the next single, "Heartbreak Feels So Good", released on January 25, 2023, with promotion featuring actress Nicole Kidman's advertisements for AMC Theatres.

Composition
Starr Bowenbank of Billboard described "Heartbreak Feels So Good" as a "rock track." Brandon Flores of Blast Out Your Stereo called the song a "light-hearted pop-rock tune". Wren Graves of Consequence noted that the song contains "dark synths and high, muted guitars", while Chad Childers of Loudwire stated that it "embraces the band's emo nature".

Music video 
The music video was directed by Whitey McConnaughy and features Rivers Cuomo of Weezer where Fall Out Boy film a prank involving "kidnapping" Cuomo.

Personnel 
Fall Out Boy
 Patrick Stump – lead vocals, rhythm guitar, songwriting
 Pete Wentz – bass guitar, songwriting
 Joe Trohman – lead guitar, keyboards, songwriting
 Andy Hurley – drums, percussion, songwriting

Additional personnel
 Neal Avron – production, mixing

Charts

References 

2023 songs
2023 singles
Pop rock songs
Fall Out Boy songs
Fueled by Ramen singles
Songs written by Patrick Stump
Songs written by Pete Wentz
Songs written by Andy Hurley
Songs written by Joe Trohman